Mirabello Cavalori (1535–1572) was an Italian painter of Mannerist style, active mainly in Florence.

Cavalori was born in Salincorno, near Montefortino. He was a contemporary of Maso da San Friano and younger than Vasari. The latter painter employed Cavalori in the decoration of the Studiolo of Francesco I in the Palazzo Vecchio, for which he produced The Wool factory and Sacrifice of Lavinia (Lavinia at the Altar) . Also in the Palazzo Vecchio can be found paintings of the Blessing of Isaac.

References

1535 births
1572 deaths
16th-century Italian painters
Italian male painters
Painters from Tuscany
Italian Mannerist painters
People from Fermo